Wyatt Family may refer to:

Wyatt family, a family of 18th and 19th century English architects
The Wyatt Family, a professional wrestling stable in WWE